is a 1980 Japanese animated television series directed by Hiroshi Sasagawa, with character designs from Leiji Matsumoto. It is based on the 1908 play by Maurice Maeterlinck. The series was 26-episodes long when aired on Japanese television. The series was made in Japan between 1978 and 1979.

Plot
Set in a German-speaking country in the 1970s, the series is about a 12-year-old girl called Mytyl and her 13-year-old brother Tyltyl seeking happiness, represented by The Blue Bird of Happiness, aided by the good fairy Bérylune. They are accompanied on their journey by their cat and dog, Shanet and Tyrol, who are given anthropomorph forms and the ability to talk by Bérylune.

Characters

Tyltyl (voiced by Toru Furuya)
Mytyl (voiced by Mami Koyama)
Tylô (Tyrol) (the dog) (voiced by Ichiro Nagai)
Tylette (Shanet) (the cat) (voiced by Fuyumi Shiraishi)
Berylune (the fairy) (voiced by Fusako Amachi)
Queen of the Night (voiced by Akihiro Miwa)
Tyltyl and Mytyl's parents (voiced by Koji Yada (father), Miyoko Shoji (ep 1) and Mari Okamoto (mother))
Water (voiced by Yoko Asagami)
Fire (voiced by Kenichi Ogata)
Time (voiced by Koji Yada)
Bread (voiced by Toshio Furukawa)
Milk (voiced by Masako Nozawa)
Sugar (voiced by Tomiko Suzuki)
Light (voiced by Mari Okamoto)

Production crew

 Producer / Planning: Yoshinobu Nishizaki
 Chief Director: Hiroshi Sasagawa
 Script: Keisuke Fujikawa, Maru Tamura 
 Original Character Design: Leiji Matsumoto
 Animation Character Design and Supervising Animation Director: Toyoo Ashida
 Assistant Animation Director: Yoshiyuki Hane 
 Art Director: Kazue Ito 
 Sound Director: Atsumi Tashiro, Yasunori Honda 
 Music: Hiroshi Miyagawa
 Production: Toei Animation (uncredited), Office Academy, Fuji TV

Episodes

Music
Opening song
Shiawase no Babira Torarira / "Babyla Tolarilla of Happiness"
Lyrics by: Michio Yamagami
Composition and arrangement by: Hiroshi Miyagawa
Song by: Midori Fukuhara

Ending song
Mado Akari / "Window Lights"
Lyrics by: Michio Yamagami
Composition and arrangement by: Hiroshi Miyagawa
Song by: Hideki Osuga

Insert songs
1. Ima Hoshi Mono wa Ai / "What I Want Now is Love"
Lyrics: Michio Yamagami
Composition and arrangement: Hiroshi Miyagawa
Performance: Midori Fukuhara

2. Obake no Fugue / "Haunted Fugue"
Lyrics: Michio Yamagami
Composition and arrangement: Hiroshi Miyagawa
Performance: Fusako Amachi

3. Yoseitachi no Fantasy / "Fairies Fantasy"
Lyrics: Michio Yamagami
Composition and arrangement: Hiroshi Miyagawa
Performance: Midori Fukuhara and Fusako Amachi

4. Yoru no Joo / "Queen of the Night"
Lyrics: Michio Yamagami
Composition and arrangement: Hiroshi Miyagawa
Performance: Akihiro Miwa

5. Jumon no Uta (Babira Torarira) / "Spell Song (Babyla Tolarilla)"
Lyrics: Michio Yamagami
Composition and arrangement: Hiroshi Miyagawa
Performance: Fusako Amachi

6. Ano Hi no You Ni / "Like That Day"
Lyrics: Michio Yamagami
Composition and arrangement: Hiroshi Miyagawa
Performance: Fusako Amachi

7. Ryukan no Matsuri / "Flu Festival"
Lyrics: Michio Yamagami
Composition and arrangement: Hiroshi Miyagawa
Performance: La Ronde

8. Mada Awanai Hito no Tame Ni / "For Those Who Haven't Met Yet"
Lyrics: Michio Yamagami
Composition and arrangement: Hiroshi Miyagawa
Performance: Hideki Osuga

9. Shiawase Party / "Happiness Party"
Lyrics: Michio Yamagami
Composition and arrangement: Hiroshi Miyagawa
Performance: La Ronde

10. Wasurenbo no Kashi no Ki / "Forgotten Oak Tree"
Lyrics: Michio Yamagami
Composition and arrangement: Hiroshi Miyagawa
Performance: Junpei Takiguchi

External links

 

1980 anime television series debuts
1980s anime television series debuts
Television series set in the 1970s
Works based on The Blue Bird (play)
Fuji TV original programming
Romance anime and manga
Television shows based on fairy tales
Toei Animation television